Testimony 2 is a progressive rock concept album by Neal Morse (his eighth studio album). It was released on 23 May 2011, as a continuation of his first Christian prog album (Testimony) and contains three sections detailing the composer's life and conversion to Christianity. Neal returns with his normal solo-album bandmates Mike Portnoy and Randy George, but he also features many guests, including a vocal reunion of Spock's Beard in the song "Time Changer", which focuses on Neal's past with his original band.

The album comes with a second disc of unrelated original songs, one of which is the epic "Seeds Of Gold", featuring a guitar solo by Steve Morse. The Special Edition includes a third disc, a Making Of DVD which runs over 60 minutes and chronicles the writing and recording of this album.

Also released with the album is Neal's first book titled Testimony - The inspirational and spiritual journey of a prog rock musician.

Track listing
All songs written and composed by Neal Morse.

Disc One

Disc Two

Disc Three (Special Edition)

Personnel

 Neal Morse - producer, composer, guitars, synth, piano, organ, vocals
 Mike Portnoy - drums
 Randy George - bass

Additional musicians
 Steve Morse - guitar solo on "Seeds of Gold"
 Paul Bielatowicz - guitar solo on "Overture No. 4" and "It's For You"
 Matthew Ward - background vocals and soulful wailing
 Debbie Bressee, April Zachary, Mark Pogue, Mita Pogue - background vocals
 Jim Hoke - saxophones
 Mark Leniger - solo saxophone
 Kenny Barnd - violin on "Jesus Bring Me Home"
 Chris Carmichael - violin, viola and cello on all of Disc One
 Eric Brenton - electric violin solo on "Time Changer"
 Nick D'Virgilio - vocals on "Time Changer"
 Alan Morse - vocals on "Time Changer"
 Dave Meros - vocals on "Time Changer"

Technical personnel
 Rich Mouser - mixing (CD1)
 Jerry Guidroz - mixing (CD2)

Charts

References

Neal Morse albums
2011 albums
Concept albums
Inside Out Music albums